Abdullah Aydın (born 18 December 2000) is a French-born Turkish professional footballer who plays as an Attacking midfielder for Ankara Keçiörengücü S.K. on loan from the Süper Lig club Beşiktaş. He is right-footed.

Career

Aydin started his career with Concarneau.
On 21 August, 2020 Aydın joined Süper Lig club Beşiktaş. In 2022, he was sent on loan to Ankara Keçiörengücü S.K..

References

2000 births
Living people
Turkish footballers
Beşiktaş J.K. footballers
Süper Lig players
TFF First League players
Association football central defenders